Perche (French: le Perche) is a former province of France, known historically for its forests and, for the past two centuries, for the Percheron draft horse breed. Until the French Revolution, Perche was bounded by four ancient territories of northwestern France: the provinces of Maine, Normandy, and Orléanais, and the region of Beauce. Afterwards it was absorbed into the present-day departments of Orne and Eure-et-Loir, with small parts in the neighboring departments of Eure, Loir-et-Cher, and Sarthe.

Toponymy
Perche is known by the following ancient Latin and French toponymic designations: saltus Particus, silva Perticus before the 6th century, pagus quem Pert[ic]ensem vocant and pagus pertensis in the 6th century, pagus Perticus no date and c. 815, Particus saltus in the 11th century, silva Perticus in 1045, [le] Perche in 1160 - 1174 and in 1308, Perche in1238, foresta de Pertico in1246, where the names starting by Pert or Part  denote Perche, the terms silva and foresta mean forest, Saltus designates a wooded mountainous region, frontier, wildlife refuge, pagus means country, and silva pertica refers to a tall-treed forest.

An hypothesis put forth by the linguist Guy Villette based on the name Perche having initially designated the forest region, and not the province, would have Perche represent the pre-Celtic name of indo-european origin *perkʷ-ik-ā « (forest) with long trees », dissimilated into *pertika, and transmitted as such in the Gallic language, even though the initial p- was foreign to this language. The indo-european radical *perkʷu-, "large tree: oak, pine, fir, beech . . ." is also the origin of the Latin word quercus « oak » and the common Germanic word *furhu-, source of the English and German words fir and Föhre « pine ».

Until about the 11th or 12th century, such terms as pagus Perticus or pagus Pertecensis used in connection with Perche's ancient forest are accordingly understood to refer to a frontier region without precise geographical limits and thus not to a clearly defined political or administrative territory.

Geography

Before the French Revolution, Perche was bounded by the following ancient provinces: Normandy to the north and west, Maine to the west, Beauce to the east and Orléanais to the south.

Perche is dominated by four topographical-featured arcs:<ref>René Musset (1920). [https://www.persee.fr/doc/geo_0003-4010_1920_num_29_158_9178 Le relief du Perche], p. 99</ref> 
An outer arc marked by the high edge of a flat high plateau to the west and south of the Perche's eastern and northern limits
An inner arc, concentric to the high plateau edge arc, defined by the Huisne River, a tributary of the Sarthe River, situated in Perche's irregular lowlands.
Forest arcs in les collines du Perche (the Perche hills) on either side of the Huisne, consisting of a main forest arc off the Huisne's left bank stretching from Moulins-la-Marche to Montmirail and a secondary forest arc off the Huisne's right bank from Pervenchères to Le Thiel.

Within the Huisne watershed lie the three unofficial Perche capitals: Nogent-le-Rotrou (economic capital), Mortagne-au-Perche (administrative capital) and Bellême (historical capital).
 
The Perche hills are the source of numerous small tributaries of the Seine River watershed via the Eure, Avre, Iton and Risle rivers and the Loire River watershed via the Huisne, Loir and Sarthe rivers.

Perche's principal towns

The following table lists the principal towns in Perche province along with the distance of any given town to Condé-sur-Huisne, situated near Perche's geographic center:

Peripheral towns

Nearby towns in the four ancient provinces along the periphery of Perche province include (starting from the north, clockwise): L'Aigle, Dreux, Chartres, Châteaudun, Le Mans, Mamers, Alençon and Sées.

Economy

Agriculture and tourism constitute the economic focus of Perche's natural region, the largest parts of which are located within the departments of Orne and Eure-et-Loir, in the regions of Normandy and Centre-Val de Loire, respectively.

The Percheron breed of draft horses originated in Perche's Huisne river valley and is identified throughout the world as the Perche's most well known symbol. Apples (for hard cider) and pears are grown throughout the Perche territory.

History

Prehistory
Perche's prehistory is manifested by megaliths (dolmens, menhirs) and prehistoric tools of flint, bronze, and iron.

Middle AgesSee also Lords, counts and dukes of Perche''

Perche was essentially a region between other regions: ". . . the Perche was not based on an existing administratative unit, such as its neighbors, the counties of Maine and Chartres, nor was it coterminous with an ecclesiastical jurisdiction.  It grew up at the margins of several larger units, and there was no major population focus nor great religious centre such as a cathedral or ancient abbey within it. It owed its existence to the ambition and energy of successive members of a lineage of warrior elite."

The Romans found possession of the Perche forests was necessary for the conquest of the vast Armorique and Normandy territories extending from the Loire estuary off the Atlantic coast to Dieppe off the English Channel.

Until the Viking or Norman invasions in the 9th century, Perche was a relatively remote area bounded on all sides by the following Gaul-Roman territories and Celtic peoples: to the east and south the Carnutes people in Chartrain territory based in Chartres; to the northeast the Aulerques Eburoviques people in Évreux territory based in Évreux; to the southwest the Aulerques Cénomans people in Maine territory based in Le Mans; and to the northwest the Hyesmois (Essuins) people in Exmes territory based in Séez.
 Vermont French-Canadian Genealogical Society: Le Perche

 
Former provinces of France
Geography of Eure
Geography of Eure-et-Loir
Geography of Loir-et-Cher
Geography of Orne
Geography of Sarthe
History of Normandy
History of Centre-Val de Loire
History of Pays de la Loire
History of Eure
History of Eure-et-Loir
History of Loir-et-Cher
History of Orne
History of Sarthe